Colorado's 4th Senate district is one of 35 districts in the Colorado Senate. It has been represented by Republican Mark Baisley since 2023. Prior to redistricting the district was represented by Republicans Jim Smallwood and Mark Scheffel.

Geography
District 4 is based in Douglas County on the southern outskirts of Denver, including Castle Pines, Castle Rock, Larkspur, Parker, Perry Park, The Pinery, and the southern tip of Aurora.

The district overlaps with Colorado's 4th and 6th congressional districts, and with the 39th, 44th, and 45th districts of the Colorado House of Representatives.

Recent election results
Colorado state senators are elected to staggered four-year terms. The old 4th district held elections in presidential years, but the new district drawn following the 2020 Census will hold elections in midterm years.

2022
The 2022 election will be the first one held under the state's new district lines. Incumbent Senator Jim Smallwood was redistricted to the 2nd district, which isn't up until 2024, and State Rep. Mark Baisley is running for the 4th district instead.

Historical election results

2020

2016

2012

Federal and statewide results in District 4

References 

4
Douglas County, Colorado